Sulfiredoxin-1 is a protein that in humans is encoded by the SRXN1 gene.

References

Further reading